Jean Monet or Monnet may refer to:

People
 Jean Monnet (director) (1703–1785), French theatre impresario and writer
 Jean Monet (son of Claude Monet) (1867–1913), frequent subject of paintings by his father Claude Monet
 Jean Monnet (1888–1979), French businessman, administrator, and institution-builder

Other
 Jean Monnet (train), an express train that linked Brussels with Strasbourg

See also